Puncture, punctured or puncturing may refer to:

 a flat tyre in British English (US English "flat tire" or just "flat")
 a penetrating wound caused by pointy objects as nails or needles
 Lumbar puncture, also known as a spinal tap
 Puncture (band), an English punk band
 Puncture (film), a 2011 American film starring Chris Evans
 Puncture (topology), the removal of a finite set of points from a manifold
 in coding theory, a punctured code, in which some of the bits of the data stream have been removed
 Pneumothorax, also known as punctured lung

See also
 Punctuality
 Punctuation
 Period (disambiguation)